Tritax Big Box REIT is a Real estate investment trust investing in "Big Box" distribution centres. It is listed on the London Stock Exchange and is a constituent of the FTSE 250 Index.

History
The company is managed by Tritax, a property management business, formed in 1995. It was the subject of an initial public offering raising £200 million in November 2013. It raised a further £150 million in July 2014, a further £110 million in November 2014 and a further £175 million in March 2015 as well as a £500 million lending facility. Addition funds were raised through placings in February 2016 and in September 2016.

Operations
The company owns, on behalf of its lessees, a Sainsbury's distribution centre in Sherburn-in-Elmet, a Tesco distribution centre near Barlborough and a Marks & Spencer distribution centre in Leicestershire. It also owns properties built for Next, Morrisons, Wolseley, DHL, Rolls-Royce, L'Oréal, Kuehne + Nagel, Ocado, Dunelm, Howdens Joinery and T.K. Maxx. The company's portfolio was valued at £4.8 billion as at 31 December 2022.

References

External links

British companies established in 2013
Property companies of the United Kingdom
Companies based in London
Companies listed on the London Stock Exchange